The Åland Football Association  is the governing body of football in Åland. ÅFF is not a member of UEFA or FIFA, but is a member of the Football Association of Finland and has the status of a District Football Association. ÅFF also runs the Åland official football team and Åland women's football team.

Background 
Åland Football Association was founded in 1943 and was originally called the Ålands Bolldistrikt. The Association currently has 12 member associations of which 11 are football clubs and one is the local referee association. They together have about 60 teams covering various ages groups. The number of registered players is currently approaching the 1000 mark.

Affiliated Members 
The following clubs are affiliated to the ÅFF:

Åland United (women's football club)
FC Aland
Hammarlands IK
IFK Mariehamn
Jomala IK
Lemlands IF
Ålands Fotbolldomare (referee association)

Presidents Åland Football Association

See also 
Football in Åland

External links 
Åland Football Association Official Site

References

Football in Åland
Finnish District Football Associations
Association football governing bodies in Europe
Sports organizations established in 1943
1943 establishments in Finland